Gary Nader is an international art collector based in Miami, Florida. Nader focuses on Latin American Art and possesses the largest private Fernando Botero collection in the world. Nader has promoted Latin American artists and has collected their works at the Latin American Art Museum (LAAM) in Miami.

Early life 
Gary Nader was born in the Dominican Republic of Lebanese parents. Nader became fascinated by art at a young age because his parents and his Uncle George owned art galleries. At the age of twelve, he purchased his first work of art, a nude portrait by the Dominican artist Juan Plutarco Andujar. His professional art career began around the age of eighteen when he started his first art gallery in Santo Domingo. Gary Nader's artistic development began with biographies of the great masters, and continued on from there with over a million articles and more than five hundred books about art.

Career

Galleries 
In 1981, Gary Nader became the Director of the Nader Gallery of Santo Domingo. By 1985, Gary had recognized the potential of Miami, Florida as a new international art destination, moved to Miami, and set up an art gallery featuring Latin American Art. His first purchase was a collection of drawings by Mexican artist Jose Luis Cuevas. Seven years later, in 1992, Gary Nader Fine Art opened in Coral Gables, Florida at 3306 Ponce de Leon Blvd with a 2,500 square foot exhibition area with the goal of showcasing masters and upcoming artists alike. Nader's rapidly expanding personal collection, and the simultaneous expansion of the art scene in Miami, required a new exhibition location. In 2006, Nader purchased his current gallery location, located in the Miami art district, Wynwood. Gary Nader Fine Art's massive 55,000 square feet of exhibition space houses the Exhibition Gallery, the Sculpture Park, and the Nader Museum.

Auctions 
By 1999, Gary Nader Fine Art had held six successful live auctions featuring Latin American Art, with over $10 million in sales, culminating in gallery's first online Latin American Art auction reaching a world-wide audience in November 1999. After a decade of organizing annual art auctions at the Miami Intercontinental Hotel, as well as publishing the accompanying auction color catalogs, Nader announced the opening of a Miami-based auction house, enabling Miami to host "some of the world's greatest collectors." The first auction was set to be held in Oct of 2011, and immediately followed by another auction during Art Basel in November 2011.

Heist 
In May of 1993, while Nader and his wife were in Chicago for an event, 11 paintings were stolen from the new art gallery, 9 of which were well-known works by the Cuban artist Wifredo Lam. The lost collection was valued at over $1 million. The other stolen works were by another Cuban artist, Rafael Soriano, and Peruvian artist, Fernando de Sziszlo. The police checked the property and the security alarm company declared it a false alarm. When the Naders returned a few days later they discovered the steel back door and deadbolt locks badly damaged and rendered useless and the missing collection.

Legal 
In 2016, Nader won a suit with Miami Dade College, resulting in a state appeals court ordering Miami Dade to pay Nader's legal fees. The suit concerned a development bid submitted by Nader to Miami Dade College to repurpose a college parking lot with a cultural center and Latin American art museum.

Reception 
Carol Damian, Ph.D., a Professor of Art History at Florida International University and a "...strong fixture in Miami's arts community, and a nationally recognized art historian" noted that, "Nader has established a number of significant art projects and publications....His books and full-color catalogues with scholarly essays have become some of the most important resources on the artists featured in his gallery exhibitions. These exhibitions have included such masters as Wifredo Lam, Matta, Fernando Botero, Mario Carreño, Julio Larraz, Agustin Cardenas, Francisco Toledo, Armando Morales and the accompanying books and extensive catalogues now represent significant scholarship on their work."

In April of 2013, Haute Living Magazine included Nader on the "Haute 100 Miami," a list of the most powerful people in Miami, and noted that Nader is "Regarded as one of the most successful gallery owners in the United States and Latin America, Nader has played an integral role in the formation of Miami's growing presence in the art world....As the largest fine art gallery in South Florida and the biggest gallery in the world, the space is home to a $500 million art collection."

Nader has also featured newer non-Latin American artists. Mikhail Baryshnikov's first photography exhibit took place at the Gary Nader Arts Center in Miami on February 24, 2012.

Publications 

 Nader, Gary (1993). Latin American Art Price Guide: Auction Records May 1977-November 1996, Includes Paintings, Drawings, Sculptures & Graphics. Miami, Florida: Gary Nader Editions. OCLC 37359281
 Nader, Gary (1994). Latin American Art Auction: Important Paintings, Sculptures, Drawings, and Graphics. Miami, Florida: Gary Nader Editions. OCLC 864718834
 Leivas, Nicolás; Damian, Carol; Nader, Gary (1996). Nicolás Leiva. Coral Gables, Florida. Gary Nader Fine Art. OCLC 82057285
 Nader, Gary (1996). Gary Nader Fine Art. Miami, Florida: Gary Nader Editions. OCLC 47645906
 Nader, Gary (1997). III Latin American Art Auction. Miami, Florida: Gary Nader Editions. OCLC 171617013
 Nader, Gary (1997). IV Latin American Art Auction: Important Paintings, Sculptures, Drawings and Graphics, Miami, Florida, Latin American Art Capital of the World. Miami, Florida: Gary Nader Editions. OCLC 41040794
 Chagall, Marc; Taylor, Dicey; Nader, Gary (1999). Marc Chagall (First ed.). Miami, Florida: Gary Nader Fine Art Editions. OCLC 51336165
 Larraz, Julio; Damian, Carol; Nader, Gary (1999). Julio Larraz. Coral Gables, Florida: Gary Nader Fine Art. OCLC 79204088
 Nader, Gary (1999). A. Caballero. Coral Gables, Florida: Gary Nader Fine Art. OCLC 80465712
 Nader, Gary (2001). Latin American, Modern & Contemporary Art Auction: Important Paintings, Sculpture and Drawings. Miami, Florida: Gary Nader Fine Art. OCLC 171402490
 Vera, Guillermo Munoz; Damian, Carol; Nader, Gary (2002). Guillermo Monoz-Vera. Coral Gables/Miami, Florida: Gary Nader Fine Art. OCLC 77606126
 Chagall, Marc; Taylor, Dicey; Nader, Gary (2002). Marc Chagall. Coral Gables, Florida: Gary Nader Fine Art Editions. OCLC 198278498
 Damian, Carol (2002). Matta. Miami, Florida: Gary Nader Editions. OCLC 53959552.
 Arteaga, Agustin; Damian, Carol; Nader, Gary (2002). Contemporanea. Miami, Florida: Gary Nader Editions. OCLC 963532719
 Lam, Wifredo; Damian, Carol; Nader, Gary (2002). Wifredo Lam: Homage 100 Birthday. Coral Gables, Florida. Gary Nader Fine Art. OCLC 198276996
 Nader, Gary (2003). Latin American Masters: Modern Masters and Contemporary. Coral Gables, Florida: Gary Nader. OCLC 54369933
 Goldfarb, Walter (2004). Walter Goldfarb: Theaters of the Body I. Miami, Florida: Gary Nader Contemporary Art. OCLC 423586066
 Damian, Carol; Nader, Gary (2005). Pablo Atchugarry. Coral Gables, Florida. OCLC 771068140
 Nader, Gary. (2007) Latin American Modern & Contemporary Art Auction for Miami Museums: Important Paintings Sculpture and Drawings. Miami, FL. Gary Nader Fine Art. OCLC 298340014
 Stella, Frank (2008). Frank Stella Studio. Miami, Florida: Gary Nader Editions. OCLC 221765210.
 Damian, Carol; Nader, Gary (2009). Matta: The Rational Versus the Irrational. Coral Gables/Miami, Florida: Gary Nader Fine Art. OCLC 1131788475
 Nader, Gary (2010). Fernando Botero: The Grand Show: Painting, Drawings & Sculpture. Miami, Florida: Gary Nader Editions. ISBN 978-0-9831769-3-0. OCLC 713659327
 Celaya, Enrique Martínez; Damian, Carol (2010). Martínez Celaya: Selected Work. Miami, Florida: Gary Nader Editions. ISBN 978-0-615-41076-0. OCLC 743226284

See also 
Art Basel
Latin American art

References 

Year of birth missing (living people)
Living people
21st-century art collectors
Lebanese art collectors